HF2 may refer to:

 Factor H, a glycoprotein.
 Housefull 2, a 2012 Bollywood film featuring an ensemble cast.